Cornelius "Neal" Craig, Jr. (April 21, 1948 – August 9, 2021) was an American professional football player who was a safety in the National Football League (NFL). He was drafted by the Cincinnati Bengals in the seventh round of the 1971 NFL Draft. He played college football at Fisk University.

He died on August 9, 2021.

References

1948 births
2021 deaths
American football safeties
Buffalo Bills players
Cincinnati Bengals players
Cleveland Browns players
Fisk Bulldogs football players
Players of American football from Cincinnati